John Joseph Edward Cassidy (March 5, 1927 – December 12, 1976), was an American actor, singer and theater director known for his work in the theater, television and films. He received multiple Tony Award nominations and a win, as well as a Grammy Award, for his work on the Broadway production of the musical She Loves Me. He also received two Primetime Emmy Award nominations. He was the father of teen idols David Cassidy and Shaun Cassidy.

Early life
Cassidy was born in New York City, the son of Charlotte (née Koehler) and William Cassidy. He was the youngest of five children. His father, an engineer at the Long Island Rail Road, was of Irish descent and his mother was of German ancestry.

Career
Cassidy achieved success as a musical performer on Broadway. He appeared in Alive and Kicking, Wish You Were Here, Shangri-La, Maggie Flynn, Fade Out – Fade In, It's a Bird...It's a Plane...It's Superman, and She Loves Me, for which he won a Tony Award. He also received Emmy Award nominations for his television performances in the 1967-68 CBS Television Network series He & She and The Andersonville Trial.

On television, he became a frequent guest star, appearing in such programs as The Alfred Hitchcock Hour, Gunsmoke, Bewitched, Get Smart, That Girl, Hawaii Five-O, Cannon, Match Game, McCloud, and Barnaby Jones for an episode titled "Murder in the Doll's House" (1973). Cassidy also appeared three times as a murderer on Columbo in the episodes "Murder By the Book" (1971, directed by-not-yet famous Steven Spielberg, with teleplay by a young Steven Bochco), "Publish or Perish" (1974), and "Now You See Him..." (1976).

He co-starred with Ronnie Schell in a television revival of Hellzapoppin'. Cassidy also co-starred as an informer in the movie The Eiger Sanction with Clint Eastwood and provided the voice of Bob Cratchit for the pioneering animated television special Mister Magoo's Christmas Carol.

His frequent professional persona was an urbane, witty, confident egotist with a dramatic flair, much in the manner of Broadway actor Frank Fay. Cassidy perfected this character to the extent that he was cast as John Barrymore in the feature film W.C. Fields and Me.

The role of the vain, shallow, buffoon-like newsman Ted Baxter on TV's The Mary Tyler Moore Show (1970–1977) was reportedly written with Cassidy in mind. Cassidy had played a similar buffoonish character in the 1967–1968 sitcom He & She,  but he turned down the role, feeling that it was not right for him; the part went to Ted Knight. Cassidy later appeared as a guest star in a 1971 episode as Ted's highly competitive and equally egotistical brother Hal.

Personal life

Marriages and children

Cassidy was married twice. His first marriage in 1948 was to actress Evelyn Ward. Together they had a son, David, who later became a teen idol. They divorced in 1956 and in the same year Cassidy married singer and actress Shirley Jones. Cassidy and Jones had three sons, Shaun, Patrick, and Ryan. Cassidy's eldest son David later starred with Jones in the musical sitcom The Partridge Family. Son Shaun also became a teen idol in the late 1970s, starring in The Hardy Boys series, and producing four top-40 records. Jones and Cassidy divorced in 1975.

Mental health
In his 1994 autobiography, C'Mon, Get Happy, Cassidy's eldest son David wrote that he became increasingly concerned about his father in the last years of his life. The elder Cassidy, who suffered from bipolar disorder and alcoholism, was displaying increasingly erratic behavior. In 1974, his neighbors were shocked to see him watering his front lawn naked in the middle of the afternoon.  Cassidy's second wife, Shirley Jones, described a similar incident when she found him sitting naked in a corner of their house, reading a book. Jones said to him that they had to get ready to do a show, and he calmly looked up and said, "I know now that I'm Christ". In December 1974, Cassidy was hospitalized in a psychiatric facility for 48 hours. At that time, Jones found out that he had been previously diagnosed with bipolar disorder.

Sexuality
David Cassidy said his father was bisexual, citing personal accounts and reports, both anecdotal and published, of his father's same-sex affairs, something neither he nor his siblings knew until after their father's death. In her 2013 memoir, Shirley Jones wrote that Cassidy had many same-sex affairs, including one with Cole Porter.

Death
On December 11, 1976, Cassidy invited his ex-wife, Shirley Jones, to his home, an apartment in West Hollywood, California, for drinks, but she declined.

In the early morning of December 12, 1976, Cassidy lit a cigarette and fell asleep on his Naugahyde couch. Asleep, he dropped the cigarette, igniting the couch. The flames spread throughout the apartment and building. At 6:15 a.m., the blaze was discovered by Deputy Sheriff John DiMatteo, who evacuated the building, and entered Cassidy's apartment. A body was found near the front door of the apartment among the ashes, and was identified as Cassidy's by dental records and a signet ring that he wore, bearing the Cassidy family crest. His remains were cremated and scattered in the Pacific Ocean.

Filmography

Film

Television

Stage
Source: Playbill Vault

Broadway

Elsewhere

Awards and nominations

Discography
Shirley Jones and Jack Cassidy albums
Speaking of Love (1957) Columbia Records
Brigadoon (1957) Columbia Records
With Love from Hollywood (1958) Columbia
Marriage Type Love (1959) RCA Records
Maggie Flynn (1968) RCA Records
Showtunes (1995) Sony Music Entertainment
Essential Masters (2011) Master Classics Records
 Marriage Type Love (2014) Columbia Masterworks Records

Guest appearances
Free to Be... You and Me (1972) Bell Records (song: "Girl Land" with Shirley Jones)

References

External links
 
 
 

1927 births
1976 deaths
20th-century American male actors
20th-century American singers
Accidental deaths in California
American male film actors
American male musical theatre actors
American male stage actors
American male television actors
American people of German descent
American people of Irish descent
Bisexual male actors
Bisexual musicians
LGBT people from New York (state)
Columbia Records artists
Deaths from fire in the United States
American bisexual actors
Male actors from New York City
People from Richmond Hill, Queens
People with bipolar disorder
RCA Records artists
Tony Award winners
20th-century American male singers
20th-century American LGBT people